The fourth season of Law & Order: Criminal Intent premiered on NBC on September 26, 2004, and ended May 25, 2005. The series remained in its time slot of Sundays at 9 PM/8c, but the season finale episode "False-Hearted Judges" aired on Wednesday, May 25, 2005 at 10 PM ET/9 CT.

Stars Vincent D'Onofrio, Kathryn Erbe, Jamey Sheridan, and Courtney B. Vance returned for the fourth season. Around mid-season, star Vincent D'Onofrio fainted twice from exhaustion, once on set and again at his home. Writers René Balcer and Elizabeth Benjamin won an Edgar Award in the category Best Episode in a Television Series Teleplay, for the episode "Want".  Almost three months before the fourth season finale, it was announced Chris Noth would join the show in the fifth season, alternating episodes with D'Onofrio, due to his health issues at the time.

Production
NBC renewed Law & Order: Criminal Intent for a fourth season on May 12, 2004. On Sundays during the 2003-2004 broadcast network TV season, Law & Order: CI was undefeated in its third season against regular competition in 18–49 and was the only NBC regular series to win that time slot in the last eight years.

In a broadcast network first, Law & Order: Criminal Intent viewers chose the fate of Detective Robert Goren's nemesis, Nicole Wallace (Olivia d'Abo): whether she lives or dies at the end of the episode "Great Barrier" (aired originally on October 17, 2004). Two versions of the episode were shot before the voting began on October 6 and ended October 20, 2004. The East Coast viewers saw Wallace live; the West Coast viewers saw her die. More than 116,000 viewers cast a vote online. "We are very gratified by the response," said show runner-executive producer René Balcer, "We've always seen this as a gift to our fans, to thank them for their continuing dedication to the series. Live or die, we'll abide by their decision." The choice of Wallace living became the outcome, but Wallace is believed to be killed in the seventh season by Detective Goren's mentor, Dr. Declan Gage (John Glover). But having fooled Declan Gage and faked her own death, Wallace reappeared in 2013 in Paris in the "Catacombs" episode of the series Jo featuring Jean Reno and Jill Hennessy and created by René Balcer. 

Previous original Law & Order actor Chris Noth guest-stars in the episode "Stress Position" as his character Detective Mike Logan before returning to join the cast for the fifth season.

Cast

Primary cast
 Vincent D'Onofrio as Detective Robert Goren
 Kathryn Erbe as Detective Alexandra Eames
 Jamey Sheridan as Captain James Deakins
 Courtney B. Vance as ADA Ron Carver

Recurring cast
 Leslie Hendrix as Chief Medical Examiner Elizabeth Rodgers

Notable guest stars

 Olivia d'Abo as Nicole Wallace
 Chris Noth as Detective Mike Logan
 Neil Patrick Harris as John Tagman
 Francie Swift as Nelda Carlson
 Tatum O'Neal as Kelly Garnett
 Frank Whaley as Mitch Godel
 Mara Hobel as April Callaway
 Carrie Preston as Doreen Whitlock
 Sam Robards as Paul Whitlock
 Jack Metzger as Billy Whitlock
 Callie Thorne as Sheila Bradley
 Robert Carradine as David Blake/Roger Withers
 Wayne Duvall as Unit Counselor Kurt Plumm
 Matt Servitto as Jim Radcliff
 Melissa Leo as Maureen Curtis
 Bronson Pinchot as Dr. Gregory Ross
 Darrell Hammond as Leonard Timmons
 Elizabeth Keifer as Marie Adair
 David Andrews as Lloyd Wilkes
 Michael Rispoli as Former Chief of Detectives Frank Adair

Episodes

References

 

Law & Order: Criminal Intent episodes
2004 American television seasons
2005 American television seasons